Ljubodrag Milošević (born 12 November 1969) is a retired Macedonian international football player and coach.

Club career
For almost ten years, Ljubodrag, played in Sileks Kratovo, only interrupted from January 2003 until January 2004, when he had a spell in Serbia in Radnički Niš. His next spell abroad was in 1998, when he went to Belgium to play two seasons in Eendracht Aalst, followed by one season in 2000 in Cyprus club Digenis Morphou. From 2001, he was back to Macedonia, where he ended his career in 2004.

International career
Milošević, despite being from Serbian descent, made his senior debut for Macedonia in a June 1997 FIFA World Cup qualification match against Iceland in Skopje and has earned a total of 9 caps, scoring no goals. His final international was a June 1998 friendly match against Bosnia and Herzegovina.

Honours
Sileks
3 times Macedonian Prva Liga Champion: 1995–96, 1996–97 and 1997–98
2 times Macedonian Cup winner: 1994 and 1997

References

External links

 

1969 births
Living people
Macedonian people of Serbian descent
Association football defenders
Yugoslav footballers
Macedonian footballers
North Macedonia international footballers
FK Sileks players
FK Radnički Niš players
S.C. Eendracht Aalst players
Digenis Akritas Morphou FC players
FK Bashkimi players
FK Pobeda players
FK Bregalnica Štip players
Macedonian First Football League players
First League of Serbia and Montenegro players
Belgian Pro League players
Cypriot First Division players
Macedonian Second Football League players
Macedonian expatriate footballers
Expatriate footballers in Serbia and Montenegro
Macedonian expatriate sportspeople in Serbia and Montenegro
Expatriate footballers in Belgium
Macedonian expatriate sportspeople in Belgium
Expatriate footballers in Cyprus
Macedonian expatriate sportspeople in Cyprus
Macedonian football managers
FK Sileks managers